Pleśna  is a village in the administrative district of Gmina Będzino, within Koszalin County, West Pomeranian Voivodeship, in north-western Poland. 

The village has a population of 30.

History
The area became part of the emerging Polish state in the 10th century. Following Poland's fragmentation, it formed part of the Duchy of Pomerania and other splinter duchies. The settlement was first mentioned in a 1334 deed, when the estates passed to the possessions held by the Prince-Bishops of Cammin (Kamień Pomorski). From the 18th century it was located within the Kingdom of Prussia, and from 1871 it was also part of Germany. Under Nazi administration, the place was temporarily renamed Roonshagen and became the site of a Luftwaffe proving ground. Following Germany's defeat in World War II in 1945, the area became again part of Poland.

Notable residents 
 Albrecht von Roon (1803–1879), Prussian general and politician

References

Villages in Koszalin County